Cyperus tenuispica is a sedge of the family Cyperaceae that is native to seasonally dry tropical areas of Africa, Asia and Australia.

It blooms between February and August producing red-brown flowers.

In Africa it is found from Mauritania in the north west to sudan in the north east down to Namibia and the Northern Provinces of South Africa in the south. In Asia the range of the plant extends from Tajikistan in Central Asia through the Himalayas and into eastern parts of Asia as far as Japan. It is found across northern Australia in Western Australia, Queensland and the Northern Territory in seasonally dry tropical areas.
It is found across northern Australia in Queensland, the Northern Territory and in Western Australia In Western Australia it is found along streams and creeks in the Kimberley region where it grows in sandy-clay soils.

See also
List of Cyperus species

References

Plants described in 1855
tenuispica
Taxa named by Ernst Gottlieb von Steudel
Flora of Western Australia
Flora of the Northern Territory
Flora of Queensland
Flora of Angola
Flora of Assam (region)
Flora of Bangladesh
Flora of Benin
Flora of Botswana
Flora of Burkina Faso
Flora of Cambodia
Flora of Cameroon
Flora of Chad
Flora of the Central African Republic
Flora of China
Flora of South Africa
Flora of Ethiopia
Flora of Ghana
Flora of Guinea
Flora of Guinea-Bissau
Flora of Ivory Coast
Flora of Japan
Flora of Java
Flora of Korea
Flora of Laos
Flora of Liberia
Flora of Malawi
Flora of Peninsular Malaysia
Flora of Mali
Flora of Mauritania
Flora of Mozambique
Flora of Myanmar
Flora of Namibia
Flora of Nepal
Flora of Nigeria
Flora of Niger
Flora of Pakistan
Flora of the Philippines
Flora of Rwanda
Flora of Senegal
Flora of Seychelles
Flora of Sierra Leone
Flora of Somalia
Flora of Sri Lanka
Flora of Sulawesi
Flora of Sumatra
Flora of Tajikistan
Flora of Taiwan
Flora of Tanzania
Flora of Thailand
Flora of Tibet
Flora of Togo
Flora of Uganda
Flora of Uzbekistan
Flora of Vietnam
Flora of Zambia
Flora of Zimbabwe
Flora of the Democratic Republic of the Congo